Epacris gunnii is a species of flowering plant in the family Ericaceae and is endemic to south-eastern Australia. It is an erect shrub with hairy branchlets, concave, sharply-pointed, broadly egg-shaped leaves, and tube-shaped, white flowers arranged along the stems.

Description
Flowering occurs from April to October in New South Wales, from September to December in Tasmania. In Victoria, flowering can occur in any month, but from October to February at higher elevations. The fruit is a capsule  in diameter.

Taxonomy
Epacris gunnii was first formally described in 1847 by Joseph Dalton Hooker in the London Journal of Botany, from specimens collected in the "Marlborough and Hampshire Hills" by Gunn and Lawrence.

Distribution and habitat
This epacris grows in forest, heath and grassland, sometime on stream banks and occurs on the coast and tablelands of eastern New South Wales, and mostly in higher places in eastern Victoria and Tasmania. In New South Wales it grows on peaty soils in association with Leptospermum glaucescens, Sprengelia incarnata and Ranunculus species.

References

gunnii
Ericales of Australia
Flora of New South Wales
Flora of Tasmania
Flora of Victoria (Australia)
Taxa named by Joseph Dalton Hooker
Plants described in 1847